Rev. Thomas F. Quinlan S.S.C., D.D. was an Irish born priest, who served as Bishop of the  Roman Catholic Diocese of Chunchon in Korea from 1945 until 1966.

Life 
Thomas Quinlan a native of Borrisoleigh, Co. Tipperary, he studied for the priesthood for four years in St. Patrick's College, Thurles, before joining the Columban Fathers. He was ordained a priest in 1920 along with three others and was posted to the Han-yang province in China. During his time in China the missionaries were a target for kidnapping and violence. After returning to Ireland, Fr. Quinlan was again posted to Korea, where he was stationed at the outbreak of the Second World War, he was appointed Bishop in 1945 serving during the Korean War.

He was captured and imprisoned by the Communists, he was held with Bishop Patrick James Byrne MM, who died and Quinlan had to bury him.

He returned to South Korea in 1954 as Regent to the Apostolic Delegation.
He retired in 1966 as Bishop and died on New Year's Eve 1970.

References

1894 births
1970 deaths
Alumni of St. Patrick's College, Thurles
20th-century Irish Roman Catholic priests
Missionary Society of St. Columban
20th-century Roman Catholic bishops in South Korea
Roman Catholic bishops of Chunchon